The Nottingham cheese riot (also known as The Great Cheese Riot) started on 2 October 1766 at the city's Goose Fair. The riot came at a time of food shortages and rising prices in England. Violence broke out when local citizens intervened to prevent Lincolnshire merchants taking away Nottinghamshire cheeses they had bought at the fair. A warehouse, shops and a cargo boat were looted; and hundreds of cheese wheels were rolled through the streets. The army was deployed when the mayor was unable to restore control. One man was killed and others wounded as soldiers opened fire on the crowds. Order was eventually restored after some days of unrest.

Background 
The Nottingham Goose Fair has its origins in the Feast of Matthew the Apostle, which was first celebrated in the city around 1,000 years ago. The feast became a livestock market where many geese were traded, and later became associated with the sale of horses, but by the 18th century it was most closely associated with foodstuffs including cheese, of which many tons were sold at the fair each year. The cheese manufactured in Nottingham at this time was sold in wheels and is believed to have been similar to Red Leicester.

The poor harvest in 1766 led to fears of impending food shortages. That year's fair, beginning on 2 October, saw a larger than usual quantity of cheese for sale, but at inflated prices.  There were recorded prices of 28 to 36 shillings (roughly £140–£180 in modern currency) per hundredweight, around twice that recorded at Coventry market just a week earlier. As a result of the shortages, people across the country were anxious to keep foodstuffs in their local area; there were instances of merchants being overpowered and forced to sell their goods at pre-shortage rates.

Riot 

The riot broke out on 2 October 1766 after some Lincolnshire merchants purchased a large quantity of cheese with the intention of selling it in their county.  They were then surrounded by a group of "rude lads" who demanded they not take away the cheese and instead share it out in Nottingham.  Violence broke out and there was widespread looting of cheese; shop windows were broken and hundreds of cheese wheels were thrown and rolled down the streets including Wheeler Gate and Peck Lane. The mayor of Nottingham attempted to restore order but was knocked over by a rolling cheese.

Some locals armed themselves and set up roadblocks on the city streets to prevent merchants from carrying away cheeses.  A boat near Trent Bridge was seized and its cargo of cheese looted, despite its owner offering to pay the crowd or to sell his wares at a low cost.  One warehouse was attacked and, though its defenders eventually drove the crowd off with firearms, some of the cheese was taken.  The warehouse owner organised a mounted posse to track down the cheese, which had been taken to Castle Donington.  The local magistrate refused to sign search warrants for houses in the village so the posse instead detained several citizens on suspicion of rioting and beat at the gates of the magistrates house, demanding justice.  The posse was driven away by a mob of women and children throwing stones and withdrew, the cheese lost.

In Nottingham the authorities called for military support to help restore peace.  Nottingham at that time was a garrison town and the 15th Dragoons, together with militia infantry and cavalry, were deployed.  Some shots were fired into the crowd causing injuries and the death of one man, William Eggleston of Car Colston who was standing near  a pile of cheese.  Eggleston was a farmer and it appears he was killed while protecting his own wares, having been mistaken for a looter.  Several people were detained and brought before magistrates in a private residence, but were freed after the house was attacked by the mob, who smashed windows to gain access.  The unrest continued overnight.

Aftermath and legacy 
Violence continued in Nottingham for several days until the military restored order.  For a while, wagons carrying cheese were formed into convoys and provided with an armed escort.  A local newspaper, the Leicester and Nottingham Journal, accused the rioters of having caused a cheese shortage in the city.  There were other riots in England in late 1766 caused by food shortages and increasing food prices.  The disorder was particularly severe in Devon and Cornwall but there were also serious outbreaks in Gloucester, Bristol, Derby, Birmingham, and Norwich; the South East was largely peaceful.

The 250th anniversary of the riot was marked in 2016 by the Lord Mayor of Nottingham, Mohammed Saghir, in conjunction with a local cheese shop.

Notes

References 

1766 in England
1766 riots
History of Nottingham
October 1766 events
Riots and civil disorder in England
Cheese
Food riots